James FitzGerald-Kenney (1 January 1878 – 21 October 1956) was an Irish Fine Gael politician and barrister who served as Minister for Justice from 1927 to 1932. He served as a Teachta Dála (TD) for the Mayo South constituency from 1927 to 1944.

Biography
He was born at his mother's family home in Clogher, near Claremorris, County Mayo. He was the second son of James Fitzgerald-Kenney of Galway and Helena Crean-Lynch. He was educated at Clongowes Wood College and University College Dublin, where he took his degree in 1898. He was called to the Bar in 1899 and built up a large practice on the Western Circuit. He was called to the Inner Bar in 1925.

In politics, he was until 1918, a supporter of John Redmond; he joined the Irish Volunteers in 1914. He was one of the earliest members of Conradh na Gaeilge.

He was re-elected at every election until he lost his seat at the 1944 general election. He subsequently retired from politics, and spent his remaining years farming at Clogher which he inherited from his mother. He died in Galway in 1956.

Ministerial career
His appointment as a minister after only a few months in parliament caused surprise, and his lack of experience made him the target of opposition attacks. Unlike Kevin O'Higgins, he allowed Eoin O'Duffy complete discretion as to how he ran the police force. He occasionally invited ridicule in his willingness to defend O'Duffy: his claim that a victim of Garda brutality had been knocked down by a cow led to a brief fashion for referring to Gardaí as "Fitzgerald-Kenney's cows". When the Four Courts, which had been badly damaged during the Irish Civil War, reopened in 1931, he firmly vetoed the proposal by the Chief Justice of Ireland Hugh Kennedy to hold a formal ceremony to mark the occasion, on the ground that it would virtually amount to an invitation to extremists to attack the building again.

References

External links

 

1878 births
1956 deaths
Cumann na nGaedheal TDs
Fine Gael TDs
Members of the 5th Dáil
Members of the 6th Dáil
Members of the 7th Dáil
Members of the 8th Dáil
Members of the 9th Dáil
Members of the 10th Dáil
Members of the 11th Dáil
Irish barristers
People educated at Clongowes Wood College
Alumni of University College Dublin
Ministers for Justice (Ireland)
Parliamentary Secretaries of the 5th Dáil
Alumni of King's Inns